The First Year is a 1932 American pre-Code film based on a 1920 play of the same name that originally ran on Broadway at the Little Theatre. The play was written by Frank Craven and produced by John Golden. It closed in 1922 after 760 performances.

In 1932, a film adapted from the Craven play was written by Lynn Starling. The film starred Janet Gaynor and Charles Farrell,  and was directed by William K. Howard.

Gaynor and Farrell made almost a dozen films together, including Frank Borzage's classics Seventh Heaven (1927), Street Angel (1928), and Lucky Star (1929); Gaynor won the first Academy Award for Best Actress for the first two and F. W. Murnau's Sunrise: A Song of Two Humans (1927).

Cast
 Janet Gaynor as Grace Livingston
 Charles Farrell as Tommy Tucker
 Minna Gombell as Mrs. Barstow
 Dudley Digges as Dr. Anderson
 George Meeker as Dick Loring
 Robert McWade as Fred Livingston

References

External links

1947 Theatre Guild on the Air radio adaptation of original play at Internet Archive

1932 films
Films directed by William K. Howard
1932 comedy-drama films
American comedy-drama films
American black-and-white films
Fox Film films
1930s English-language films
1930s American films